Catherine "Cat" Frazier is an American graphic designer and blogger. She currently works as a designer for California’s Pacific Gas and Electric Company, but she is best known for AnimatedText, a blog where she posts original animated text GIFs made on request. She currently lives in Oakland, California.
Her inspirations include Jeremy Bailey, Paula Sher, and Dominica Falla. She is black and openly queer.

Career 
Frazier graduated from Pratt Institute in 2013 with a Bachelor of Arts degree in Critical and Visual Studies. Since then, she has worked for a variety of companies as a designer, and she is currently employed at California's Pacific Gas and Electric Company.

She began her Tumblr blog, AnimatedText, in fall 2012. On this blog, she primarily publishes original animated text GIFs that she makes using the programs Xara 3D Maker 7 and Photoshop CS6. Her first GIF to go viral was a spinning, serif font text that read "lol nothing matters". In March 2013, Frank Ocean reblogged her GIF of the text "ur not gucci lol", greatly increasing her follower base.

In 2016 Frazier began a new project called "Ask Cat," through which she gives advice to people who anonymously text her. After someone texts her, she responds with an animated text GIF and some advice in response to the person's question. This project is in partnership with Useless Press, an online publishing collective that asked her to collaborate.

Blog 
The content on Frazier's blog, AnimatedText, has a "retro-maximalist" aesthetic recalling the late 1990s' World Wide Web and early social sites like GeoCities. Frazier was interested in the customizability and appearance of websites she grew up with, particularly sites such as GeoCities, Myspace, and Blingee. This interest began when she came across Internet Archaeology, a website that recovers and shares graphic artifacts from earlier days of internet culture. Frazier realized that she was dissatisfied with the principles of graphic design she had learned in her career (e.g. clean, legible, generic), so she embraced the unapologetic tackiness of the old-Internet graphics that she felt created an "empowerment-through-DIY" via their personalization and non-requirement of design expertise.

Frazier has an ongoing problem concerning her identity: people often assume that she is a straight white man. In 2015, she began to post selfies of herself to prove that she wasn't who people assumed she was, opposing the "presumed neutrality" of all people on the internet being "straight, white, and male."

References

External links 
 AnimatedText

Year of birth missing (living people)
Living people
American women bloggers
American bloggers
Queer women
21st-century American women